The 1951 Australian federal election was held in Australia on 28 April 1951. All 121 seats in the House of Representatives and all 60 seats in the Senate were up for election, due to a double dissolution called after the Senate rejected the Commonwealth Bank Bill. The incumbent Liberal–Country coalition led by Prime Minister Robert Menzies defeated the opposition Labor Party led by Ben Chifley with a modestly reduced majority, and secured a majority in the Senate. This was the last time the Labor party ever held a Senate majority. Chifley died just over a month after the election.

Issues
Although the Coalition had won a comfortable majority in the House in 1949, Labor still had a four-seat majority in the Senate.  Chifley thus made it his business to obstruct Menzies's agenda at every opportunity.  Realizing this, Menzies sought to call a double dissolution at the first opportunity in hopes of gaining control of both houses. He thought he had his chance in 1950, when he introduced a bill to ban the Australian Communist Party.  However, after a redraft, Chifley let the bill pass.

A few months later, the Senate rejected the Commonwealth Bank Bill 1950, in which the Coalition government aimed to establish a "Commonwealth Bank Board", which Labor believed would be filled with private banking interests. This finally gave Menzies an excuse to call a double dissolution. While the Coalition lost five House seats to Labor, it still had a solid mandate.  More importantly, it picked up six Senate seats, giving it control over both chambers.

Results

House of Representatives

Notes
 Three members were elected unopposed – two Labor and one Liberal.

Senate

Seats changing hands

Opinion polling

See also
 Candidates of the Australian federal election, 1951
 Members of the Australian House of Representatives, 1951-1954
 Members of the Australian Senate, 1951–1953

Notes

References

University of WA  election results in Australia since 1890
AEC 2PP vote
Prior to 1984 the AEC did not undertake a full distribution of preferences for statistical purposes. The stored ballot papers for the 1983 election were put through this process prior to their destruction. Therefore, the figures from 1983 onwards show the actual result based on full distribution of preferences.

Federal elections in Australia
1951 elections in Australia
April 1951 events in Australia